Ben T. Williams (1910 – 1982) was a justice of the Oklahoma Supreme Court from 1953 to 1982. He served as chief justice twice, in 1961-62 and in 1975-76. He lived in Oklahoma City, and also maintained a home in Pauls Valley, Oklahoma.

Williams was born in Johnson County, Texas, and later moved to Garvin County, Oklahoma. He earned a bachelor's degree from the University of Oklahoma, then earned his law degree from the University of Oklahoma College of Law.  After receiving his law degree, he became the city attorney for Stratford, Oklahoma, then became the Garvin County judge for four years. He was elected District Judge in 1938, a position he held for 14 years, before he was appointed Associate Justice of the Oklahoma Supreme Court in 1952, and served two terms as chief justice. He also was a part-time instructor at the Oklahoma City University School of Law.

Williams was on the bench when an infamous corruption scandal broke in July 1964. A U.S. attorney alleged that he had a witness who had witnessed a payoff of Oklahoma Supreme Court justices in 1957. The Oklahoma Bar Association investigated the allegation, and completely exonerated Williams and six other justices. Disciplinary action was recommended against two other justices.

Williams had announced in December 1981 that he would retire on January 31, 1982, but died on January 11, 1982. He had been hospitalized for 48 days at Baptist Medical Center in Oklahoma City. He was survived by his widow, Ruth, and son, Ben T. Williams, Jr.

Williams' widow, Ruth T. Williams (née Turner) died on June 23, 1991, in Dallas, Texas. Her obituary named her surviving son and daughter-in-law, Ben, Jr. and Jane Williams, and three grandsons, as well as another son, Laurence Thompson Williams, who had predeceased her.

Notes

References

Justices of the Oklahoma Supreme Court
People from Johnson County, Texas
People from Garvin County, Oklahoma
People from Pauls Valley, Oklahoma
People from Oklahoma City
1910 births
1982 deaths
University of Oklahoma College of Law alumni
20th-century American judges